General elections were held in Dutch New Guinea for the first and only time in January 1961.

Background
The elections were held following the establishment of the New Guinea Council (Raad) to replace the Council of Directors, which consisted of the heads of government departments. The new council consisted of 16 elected members and 12 members appointed by the Governor. Voting was open to all Dutch citizens aged 21 and over who had lived in the territory since 1 January 1958.

The 16 elected members were elected from 14 constituencies. Members were directly elected in Hollandia and Manokwari, with the other twelve constituencies having a two-stage process where voters elected representatives that subsequently selected the Council members. Illiterate voters were able to whisper the name of their chosen representative to polling station staff.

Results

Appointed members

Aftermath
J.H.F. Sollewijn Gelpke was chosen as Speaker.

References

Dutch
Dutch
Netherlands New Guinea
New Guinea Council
January 1961 events in Asia
January 1961 events in Oceania
Election and referendum articles with incomplete results